The  is a Japanese commuter railway line operated by the Seibu Railway, a major private railroad in Tokyo. The single-track line connects Higashi-Murayama Station and Seibuen Station, both located in Higashimurayama, Tokyo.

Stations
Both stations are located in Higashimurayama, Tokyo.

History
The line was opened on 5 April 1930.

References

Railway lines in Tokyo
Seibu Shinjuku Line
Lines of Seibu Railway
1067 mm gauge railways in Japan
1930 establishments in Japan